Sportverein Seekirchen 1945  is a football club from Seekirchen am Wallersee, a city in Salzburg. The club plays in the Regionalliga Salzburg, the 3rd level of Austrian football.

The club was founded 1945 as Union Seekirchen and started playing in the league system in 1946. In 1997 they reached the Regionalliga for the first time.

Current squad

Coaching staff

  Mario Lapkalo Headcoach
  Christoph Mühllechner Assistant coach
 Hans-Peter Berger Goalkeeper coach

League

Honours
 Austrian Landesliga: 1997, 1999, 2002
 Austrian 2. Landesliga: 1993
 Austrian Regionalliga West: 1997/98, 1999/2000, 2002/03, 2003/04, 2004/05, 2005/06, 2006/07, 2007/08, 2008/09, 2009/10, 2010/11, 2011/12, 2012/2013, 2013/2014, 2014/2015, 2015/16, 2016/17, 2017/18, 2018/19, 2019/20, 2020/21, 2021/22

Notable players
SV Seekirchen is known for developing young players. 
 Robert Ibertsberger (Austria Salzburg, AC Venezia, Sturm Graz, FC Tirol Innsbruck)
 Andreas Ibertsberger (Austria Salzburg, SC Freiburg, TSG 1899 Hoffenheim)
 Herbert Laux (Austria Salzburg, SV Ried, Vorwärts Steyr)
 Manfred Pamminger (Austria Salzburg, SC Austria Lustenau, ASKÖ Pasching)
 Thomas Winklhofer (Austria Salzburg, FC Swarovski Tirol, WSG Swarovski Wattens)
 Heimo Pfeifenberger (Austria Salzburg, Werder Bremen, SK Rapid Wien)
 Markus Scharrer (Austria Salzburg, FC Tirol, LASK Linz)
 Stefan Lainer (FC Red Bull Salzburg, Borussia Mönchengladbach)

References

1945 establishments in Austria
Association football clubs established in 1945
SV Seekirchen